The Queensland Railways DD17 class locomotive was a class of 4-6-4T steam locomotives operated by the Queensland Railways. It is an improved version of the earlier Queensland D17 locomotive.

History
With the D16 and D17 class locomotives becoming life expired, between 1948 and 1952, twelve DD17s were built at North Ipswich Railway Workshops. Per Queensland Railway's classification system they were designated the DD17 class, D representing they were a tank locomotive, and the 17 the cylinder diameter in inches.

The first tank engine was painted black with red lining. The next five tanks were painted blue and the last six engines midway blue. They operated suburban passenger trains in Brisbane out of Mayne depot, mostly on the northside. They also operated freight trains in the off-peaks.

Preservation
Four examples have been preserved:
1046 by the Zig Zag Railway, Lithgow, NSW, having been operational between 1975 and the mid-1980s. It is now dismantled.
1047 is stored on the Zig Zag Railway having been operational between the 1970s and the mid-1990s.
1049 is currently stored at the Zig Zag Railway. It was restored to operation in 1994 and was the workhorse of the Zig Zag railway until 2011. It is stored awaiting a major overhaul
1051 is currently undergoing overhaul and is part of the Queensland Rail Heritage Fleet, based at the Workshops Rail Museum.

References

External links

Railway locomotives introduced in 1948
DD17
4-6-4T locomotives